Ursuline may refer to:
 Ursulines, Catholic religious institutes that have been deeply involved in education

Canada 
 École des Ursulines, Quebec, founded in 1639

United Kingdom 
 England
 Brentwood Ursuline Convent High School, an all-girls school in Essex
 Ursuline Academy Ilford, an all-girls school and specialist science school, situated in north east London
 Ursuline College, Westgate-on-Sea, a specialist sports school in north-east Kent
 Ursuline High School (Wimbledon), an all-girls school in Wimbledon, London, for ages 11–19

Taiwan 
 Wenzao Ursuline University of Languages, a languages school in Kaohsiung

United States 

 Ursuline High School (Santa Rosa, California), an all-girls high school from 1880 to 2011
 Ursuline Academy (Delaware), a school in Wilmington that offers grades K–12
 Ursuline Academy (Illinois), a high school in Springfield that operated from 1857 to 2007
 Ursuline Campus Schools, a campus containing five schools in Louisville, Kentucky 
 Ursuline Academy (New Orleans), an all-girls high school and elementary school in Louisiana
 Ursuline Academy (Dedham, Massachusetts), an all-girls school in Dedham
 Ursuline Academy (Oakland, Missouri), an all-girls high school near St. Louis
 Ursuline Academy (Great Falls, Montana), a convent and former school that is listed on the National Register of Historic Places
 The Ursuline School, an all-girls middle and high school in New Rochelle, New York
 Ursuline Academy (Cincinnati, Ohio), an all-girls high school founded in 1896
 Ursuline College, a women's college in Pepper Pike, Ohio
 Ursuline High School, Youngstown, a co-ed high school in Ohio, founded in 1905
 Ursuline Academy (Pittsburgh), Pennsylvania, an all-girls school from 1895 to 1981
 Ursuline Academy of Dallas, an all-girls school in Texas
 Ursuline Academy (San Antonio, Texas), a National Register of Historic Places listing in Bexar County, Texas

See also
 St. Ursula Academy (disambiguation)
 Ursuline High School (disambiguation)
 Ursuline Sisters (disambiguation)